Stigmella pomivorella is a moth of the family Nepticulidae. It is found in New York, Washington, Massachusetts, Nova Scotia, Ontario and British Columbia.

The larvae feed on Rosaceae species. They mine the leaves of their host plant. The larvae mine long narrow serpentine tracks, gradually widening at the end. The cocoon is reddish brown.

External links
Nepticulidae of North America
A taxonomic revision of the North American species of Stigmella (Lepidoptera: Nepticulidae)

Nepticulidae
Moths described in 1870
Endemic fauna of the United States
Moths of North America